Cappeller Fauna Park is a zoo and amusement park in Cartigliano, Veneto, northern Italy. Opened in 1998, it extends over an area of 4 hectares.

Gallery

External links
Official website

References 

Zoos in Italy
Tourist attractions in Veneto
Parks in Veneto
Buildings and structures in Veneto
Zoos established in 1998